Hallingskarvet is a mountain range in southern Norway stretching from Geilo to Finse in Vestland and Viken counties.

In the north, there is a large dammed lake called Strandavatnet.

In 2006, the Hallingskarvet mountain range became part of the Hallingskarvet National Park.

See also
List of mountains of Norway

References

Mountain ranges of Norway
Landforms of Vestland
Landforms of Viken (county)
Scandinavian Mountains